The Women's super combined competition at the 2013 World Championships was held on Friday, February 8. There were 47 athletes competing from 25 countries.

Results
The downhill race started at 10:00 local time (UTC+1) and the slalom at 14:00.

References

External links
  
 FIS-Ski.com - AWSC 2013 - calendar & results

Women's Super combined
2013 in Austrian women's sport
FIS